SEM-XRF is an established technical term for adding a (typically micro-focus) X-ray generator (X-ray source) to a Scanning Electron Microscope (SEM). Technological progress in the fields of small-spot low-power X-ray tubes and of polycapillary X-ray optics has enabled the development of compact micro-focus X-ray sources that can be attached to a SEM equipped for energy-dispersive X-ray spectroscopy (EDS, EDX, EDXS or XEDS).

As shown in the image at right, when micro-focus X-ray fluorescence (microXRF) is performed with a SEM, elemental analysis analytical figures of merit are extended to the point where trace level quantification and bulk analysis are possible. By combining the analytical information obtained from the X-ray spectra excited with electrons and with photons respectively, the main elements as well as trace elements, of low and high atomic number, can be analyzed – albeit with different spatial resolutions.

In 1986, Sandia and Lawrence Livermore National Labs coauthored a paper (with Kevex Corporation) regarding parameters affecting X-ray micro-fluorescence. As a followup in 1988, Cross & Wherry described an X-ray micro-fluorescence analyzer which combines the nondestructive analytical method of X-ray fluorescence with relatively small spatial discrimination (less than 50 μm) such that composition (chemistry), thickness and micro-structural measurements can be made on a wide variety of heterogeneous materials in a few seconds. It was shown that, by scanning samples with an X-Y stage, quantitative or qualitative micro-structural information could be gathered. Both these papers provided a preview into the coming integration of Micro-X-ray fluorescence with SEM.

By 1991, Pozsgai published a review article detailing the possibilities of carrying out x-ray micro-fluorescence analysis within the SEM context. The main approaches involved converting the electron optical column of an electron microscope into a transmission x-ray tube, using micro-focusing x-ray tubes, combining x-ray tubes with capillary techniques, as well as combining x-ray tubes with monochromators and applying synchrotron radiation.

SEM-XRF was first commercialized by IXRF Systems (Austin, TX) in March 2005. Bruker Corporation (Billerica, MA) followed in August 2013.

References

External Links 

Advanced Elemental Analysis with ED-EPMA, WD-EPMA and µ-XRF at a SEM. V.-D. Hodoroaba, et al. Microscopy and Microanalysis 17:600-601, July 2011.

Comparing the detection of iron-based pottery pigment on a carbon-coated Sherd by SEM-EDS and by Micro-XRF-SEM. Michael Pendleton, et al. The Yale Journal of Biology and Medicine. 87(1):15-20, March 2014.

Micro-XRF excitation in an SEM. M. Haschke, F. Eggert and W. T. Elam. X-ray Spectrometry. Vol. 36, No. 4, p. 254-259 (2007).

Micro-XRF in Scanning Electron Microscopes. Michael Haschke and Stephan Boehm. Advances in Imaging and Electron Physics. Vol. 199, p 1-60, (2017).

A flexible setup for angle-resolved X-ray fluorescence spectrometry with laboratory sources. M. Spanier, C. Herzog, D. Grötzsch, F. Kramer, I. Mantouvalou, J. Lubeck, J. Weser, C. Streeck, W. Malzer, B. Beckhoff, B. Kanngießer. Review of Scientific Instruments, Vol 87, No 3, (035108), (2016).

Michael Haschke, Laboratory Micro-X-Ray Fluorescence Spectroscopy, Vol. 55 (2014).

Trends in environmental science using microscopic X-ray fluorescence. Ursula Elisabeth Adriane Fittschen & Gerald Falkenberg. Spectrochimica Acta Part B: Atomic Spectroscopy, Vol 66, No 8, p 567-580 (2011).

Determination of the real transmission of an X‐ray lens for micro‐focus XRF at the SEM by coupling measurement with calculation of scatter spectra. V.‐D. Hodoroaba & M. Procop. X-Ray Spectrometry, Vol 38, No 3, p 216-221, (2009).

Improvements of the low-energy performance of a micro-focus x-ray source for XRF analysis with the SEM Procop, Mathias; et al. X‐Ray Spectrometry: An International Journal 38.4 (2009): 308-311.

A microfocus X-ray source for improved EDS and XRF analysis in the SEM. Procop, Mathias, Vasile-Dan Hodoroaba, and Vanessa Rackwitz. Microscopy and analysis / European edition. p 10-13 (May, 2011).

X-ray fluorescence as an additional analytical method for a scanning electron microscope. Procop, M., Hodoroaba, V. Microchim Acta Vol 161, p 413–419 (2008).

Gaining improved chemical composition by exploitation of Compton-to-Rayleigh intensity ratio in XRF analysis. Hodoroaba, Vasile-Dan, and Vanessa Rackwitz. Analytical Chemistry 86.14 (2014): 6858-6864.

Pendleton, M. W., et al. Detecting iron-based pigments on ruthenium-coated archaeological pottery by SEM-EDS and by micro-XRF-SEM. Microscopy and Microanalysis 20.S3 (2014): 2030-2031.

Rackwitz, Vanessa, et al. Performance of μ-XRF with SEM/EDS for trace analysis on the example of RoHS relevant elements–measurement, optimization and prediction of the detection limits. Journal of Analytical Atomic Spectrometry 28.9 (2013): 1466-1474.

Sieber, John R., and Adam Mortensen. “Validation and traceability of XRF and SEM‐EDS elemental analysis results for solder in high‐reliability applications.” X‐Ray Spectrometry 43.5 (2014): 259-268.

Micro XRF Element Maps Are A New Method Of Detecting Elements At Lower Concentrations Than The Electron Beam Produced Corollary: A Garnet Schist Example.” Microscopy and Microanalysis 15.S2 (2009): 34-35.

Commercial links 

Two commercial vendors offer this technology:
 Xb Micro-XRF
 QUANTAX Micro-XRF

Electron microscopy techniques